The Energy Performance of Buildings Directive (2010/31/EC, the "EPBD") is the European Union's main legislative instrument aiming to promote the improvement of the energy performance of buildings within the European Union. It was inspired by the Kyoto Protocol which commits the EU and all its parties by setting binding emission reduction targets.

In 2021, the European Commission proposed to review the directive, with a view of introducing more exigent energy efficiency minimum standards for new and existing buildings, improved availability of energy performance certificates by means of public online databases, and to introduce financial mechanisms to incentivize banks to provide loans for energy efficient renovations.

History

Directive 2002/91/EC 

The first version of the EPBD, directive 2002/91/EC, was approved on 16 December 2002 and entered into force on 4 January 2003. EU Member States (MS) had to comply with the Directive within three years of the inception date (4 January 2006), by bringing into force necessary laws, regulations and administrative provisions. In the case of lack of qualified and/or accredited experts, the directive allowed for a further extension in implementation by 4 January 2006.

The Directive required that the MS strengthen their building regulations and introduce energy performance certification of buildings. More specifically, it required member states to comply with Article 7 (Energy Performance Certificates), Article 8 (Inspection of boilers) and Article 9 (Inspection of air conditioning systems).

Directive 2010/31/EU 

Directive 2002/91/EC was later on replaced by the so-called "EPBD recast", which was approved on 19 May 2010 and entered into force on 18 June 2010.

This version of the EPBD (Directive 2010/31/EU) broadened its focus on Nearly Zero-energy buildings, cost optimal levels of minimum energy performance requirements as well as improved policies.

According to the recast:
 for buildings offered for sale or rent, the energy performance certificates shall be stated in the advertisements
 Member States shall lay down the necessary measures to establish inspection schemes for heating and air-conditioning systems or take measures with equivalent impact
 all new buildings shall be nearly zero energy buildings by 31 December 2020; the same applies to all new public buildings after 31 December 2018.
 Member States shall set minimum energy performance requirements for new buildings, for buildings subject to major renovation, as well as for the replacement or retrofit of building elements 
 Member States shall draw up lists of national financial measures and instruments to improve the energy efficiency of buildings.

Directive  2018/844/EU 

On 30 November 2016, the European Commission published the "Clean Energy For All Europeans", a package of measures boosting the clean energy transition in line with its commitment to cut  emissions by at least 40% by 2030, modernise the economy and create conditions for sustainable jobs and growth.

The proposal for a revised directive on the EPBD (COM/2016/0765) puts energy efficiency first and supports cost-effective building renovation. The proposal updated the EPBD through:
 The incorporation of long-term building renovation strategies (Article of 4 Energy Efficiency Directive), the support to mobilise finance and a clear vision for the decarbonisation of buildings by 2050
 The encouragement of the use of information communication and smart technologies to ensure the efficient operation of buildings 
 Streamlined provisions in the case of delivery failure of the expected results
 introduces building automation and control (BAC) systems as an alternative to physical inspections
 encourages the roll-out of the required infrastructure for e-mobility and introduces a "smartness indicator"
 strengthens the links between public funding for building renovation and energy performance certificates and 
 incentivises tackling energy poverty through building renovation.

On 11 October 2017, the European Parliament's Committee on Industry, Research and Energy (ITRE) voted positively on a draft report led by Danish MEP Bendt Bendtsen. The Committee "approved rules to channel the focus towards energy-efficiency and cost-effectiveness of building renovations in the EU, updating the EPBD as part of the "Clean Energy for All Europeans" package".

Bendt Bendtsen, member of ITRE and rapporteur of the EPBD review dossier said: "It is vital that Member States show a clear commitment and take concrete actions in their long-term planning. This includes facilitating access to financial tools, showing investors that energy efficiency renovations are prioritised, and enabling public authorities to invest in well-performing buildings".

The proposal was finally approved by the Council and the European Parliament in May 2018.

Proposed revision of EPBD (2021) 
In 2021, the European Commission, under the leadership of Estonian Commissionner Kadri Simson proposed a new revision of the Directive, in the context of the "Fit for 55" legislative package. The proposal includes the following priorities:

 Obligation for all member states to establish National building renovation plans
 Establishment of minimum energy performance standards (MEPS), requiring the worst energy performant (non-residential) buildings to reach at least class F by 2030 and class E by 2033.
 Promotion of technical assistance, including one-stop-shops and renovation passports
 Introduction of new financial mechanisms to incentivize banks and mortgage holders to promote energy efficient renovation (mortgage portfolio standard)

Following the outbreak of the war in Ukraine, the Commission issued additional proposals, such as the obligation to ensure new buildings are solar ready and to install solar energy installations on buildings.

The commission's proposal is currently being discussed and negotiated in the council and at the European Parliament. The chief negotiator for the file in the European Parliament is Green MEP Ciaran Cuffe.

The Parliament is expected to vote on the proposal by December 2022.

EPBD Support Initiatives 

The European Commission has launched practical support initiatives with the objective to help and support EU countries with the implementation of the EPBD.

EPBD Concerted Action 

The Concerted Action EPBD (CA EPBD) was launched in 2005 under the European Union's Horizon 2020 research and innovation programme to address the Energy Performance of Buildings Directive (EPBD), with the objective to promote dialogue and exchange of knowledge and best practices between all 28 Member States and Norway for reducing energy use in buildings.

The first CA EPBD was launched in 2005 and closed in June 2007 followed by a second phase and a third phase from 2011 to 2015. The current CA EPBD (CA EPBD IV), a joint initiative between the EU Member States and the European Commission, runs since October 2015 to March 2018 with the aim to transpose and implement the EPBD recast.

EPBD Buildings Platform 

The EPBD Buildings Platform was launched by the European Commission in the framework of the Intelligent Energy – Europe, 2003–2006 Programme, as the central resource of information on the EPBD. The Platform comprises databases with publications, events, standards and software tools. Interested organisations or individuals could submit events and publications to the databases. A high number of information papers (fact sheets) were also produced, with the aim to inform a wide range of people of the status of work in a specific area. The platform also offered a helpdesk with lists of frequently asked questions and the possibility to ask individual questions.

This initiative was completed at the end of 2008, and a new one, 'BUILD UP' was launched in 2009.

BUILD UP 
 
As a continuation of its support to the Member States in implementing the EPBD, the European Commission launched the BUILD UP initiative in 2009. The initiative has been receiving funding under the framework of the Intelligent Energy Europe (IEE) Programme. The first BUILD UP (BUILD UP I) was launched in 2009 and closed in 2011 when BUILD UP II followed in 2012 and ran until 2014. BUILD UP III was running from January 2015 until December 2017. BUILD UP IV started early 2018.

The BUILD UP web portal aims to increase awareness and foster the market transformation towards Nearly Zero-Energy Buildings, catalysing and releasing Europe's collective intelligence for an effective implementation of energy saving measures in buildings, by connecting building professionals, including competent authorities.

The portal includes databases of publications, news, events, software tools & blog posts. Since the start of BUILD UP II in 2009 the portal introduced added value content items namely as overview articles (allowing for users to read / download them on demand) and free participation webinars, providing an effective learning resource.

The platform also incorporates the "BUILD UP Skills" webpage, an initiative launched in 2011 under the IEE programme to assist with the training and further education of craftsmen, on-site workers and systems installers of the building sector. BUILD UP hosts all BUILD UP Skills related information (EU Exchange Meetings, Technical Working Groups (TWGs), National pages and country factsheets, news, events and previous newsletters) under its separate section "Skills".

Intelligent Energy Europe (IEE) Programme 
The EU's Intelligent Energy Europe (IEE) Programme was launched in 2003; the first IEE Programme (IEE I) closed in 2006, and was followed by the second IEE Programme (IEE II) from 2007 to 2013. Most parts of the IEE programme were run by the Executive Agency for SMEs, EASME -formerly known as the Executive Agency for Competitiveness and Innovation (EACI)- on behalf of the European Commission. The Programme "supported projects which sought to overcome non-technical barriers to the uptake, implementation and replication of innovative sustainable energy solutions". From 2007 to 2013, the IEE II Programme allocated €72m (16% of the entire IEE II funding) to 63 building-related projects (including CA EPBD II & III), revealing the strong support for enabling EPBD implementation. The range of topics was broad, covering the fields of deep renovation, Nearly Zero-Energy Buildings, Energy Performance Certificates, renewable energy and the exemplary role of public buildings. Since the Programme's completion, the EU's Horizon 2020 Framework Programme has been funding these type of activities.

See also 
 Energy Performance Certificate, which arose from the implementation of the Directive in the United Kingdom

References

External links 
 Concerted Action EPBD 
 BUILD UP portal

Energy development
Energy economics
Energy policies and initiatives of the European Union
Energy performance of buildings
Low-energy building
2002 in law
2002 in the European Union